Eldorado Mine may refer to:
Eldorado Mine (Northwest Territories)
Eldorado Mine (Saskatchewan)

See also
El Dorado (disambiguation)